Russia has submitted films for the American Academy Award for Best International Feature Film since 1992. Prior to that, Russian SFSR-produced films formed the vast majority of motion pictures submitted by the former Soviet Union. The Foreign Language Film award is handed out annually by the U.S.-based Academy of Motion Picture Arts and Sciences to a feature-length motion picture produced outside the United States that contains primarily non-English dialogue.

Each year, the Academy invites countries to submit their best films for competition, with only one film being accepted from each country. The Soviet Union received a total of nine nominations in the category between 1968–1984, including three winners – War and Peace, Dersu Uzala and Moscow Does Not Believe in Tears. Eight of the nominees, including all three winners, were produced by Russian film studios. After the breakup of the Soviet Union, films representing the Russian Federation have had a further seven nominations, including one Oscar win for Burnt by the Sun.

Nikita Mikhalkov has been chosen to represent Russia five times. While The Barber of Siberia was disqualified when the print did not arrive in Los Angeles in time, three other films were nominated for an Oscar.

Submissions
The Academy of Motion Picture Arts and Sciences has invited the film industries of various countries to submit their best film for the Academy Award for Best Foreign Language Film since 1956. The Foreign Language Film Award Committee oversees the process and reviews all the submitted films. Following this, they vote via secret ballot to determine the five nominees for the award. Below is a list of the films that have been submitted by Russia for review by the Academy since 1992. All Russian submissions were filmed mostly in Russian.

Among the submissions were a horror film about vampires (2004), a Russian film dubbed into German (1999), a controversial anti-corruption film (2014) and a slew of historical dramas.

In 2022, Russia's Oscar Committee, headed by Pavel Chukhray, confirmed its intention to submit a film. However, days later, the Russian Film Academy announced they would not enter. Chukhray resigned in protest and said he was not consulted about the decision. Nikita Mikhalkov, alluding to the United States' reaction to the 2022 Russian invasion of Ukraine, had previously said, "The way I see it, choosing a film that will represent Russia in a country that, in fact, now denies the existence of Russia, is simply pointless."

See also
List of Soviet submissions for the Academy Award for Best Foreign Language Film
Cinema of Russia
Cinema of the Soviet Union
List of Academy Award winners and nominees for Best Foreign Language Film

Notes

References

Russian
Academy Award